Jimbo is a diminutive form of the given name James. It is also a Japanese surname, and it means state or province in Swahili. It may refer to:

Given name or nickname
 Jimbo (drag queen), a.k.a. James Insell, Canadian theatrical designer and drag queen
 Jimbo Aquino (born 1985), Filipino professional basketball player
 Jim Covert (born 1960), former American football player
 Jimbo Elrod (1954–2016), former American football player
 Jimbo Fisher (born 1965), American college football coach and former player
 Jimbo Mathus (born 1967), co-founder of the band Squirrel Nut Zippers
 James Richardson (born 1956), known as AC Jimbo. The host of Football Italia and former host of The Guardian's Football Weekly
 Jimmy Wales (born 1966), co-founder of Wikipedia
 Jimbo Wallace, bass guitarist for the American psychobilly band The Reverend Horton Heat

Surname
Akira Jimbo (born 1959), drummer
Michio Jimbo (born 1951), mathematician
Rei Jimbo (born 1974), Olympic synchronized swimmer

Fictional characters
 Jimbo, a recurring comic book character of Gary Panter
 Jimbo Gumbo, a character in the comic strip Rose Is Rose
 Jimbo, a talking airplane in Jimbo and the Jet Set, a British animated cartoon series
 Jimbo, nickname of James Rockford in the TV series The Rockford Files
 Jimbo Jones, a character in the TV series The Simpsons
 Jimbo Kern, a character in the TV series South Park
 Jimbo, nickname of Code Lyoko character Jim Moralés
 Jimbo, nickname of The Adventures Of Jimmy Neutron character Jimmy Neutron
 Jimbo, the name of a teddy gorilla given away by Co-op UK
 Jimbo, the name given to Bill Rizer in the American localization of Contra III: The Alien Wars
 Jimbo, the nickname of the protagonist in the movie Treasure Planet
 Jimbo, the eponymous protagonist of the novel Jimbo by Algernon Blackwood
 Thardid Jimbo, cannibal giant in Australian Aboriginal mythology
 Jimbo, nickname of James Gordon in the TV series Gotham
 Jimbo, a character in The Boss Baby

See also

 James (disambiguation)
 Jim (disambiguation)
 Jimmy (disambiguation)
 

 

Lists of people by nickname